Paraphyola angustifrons is a species of ulidiid or picture-winged fly in the genus Paraphyola of the family Ulidiidae.

References

Ulidiidae